Boris de Rachewiltz (born as Luciano Baratti) (1926–1997) was an Italian-Russian Egyptologist and writer on Africa and the ancient world.

Biography 
Boris de Rachewiltz, brother of the historian Igor de Rachewiltz, married Mary, the daughter of Ezra Pound and Olga Rudge, in 1946. He studied Egyptology at the Pontifical Biblical Institute in Rome from 1951 to 1955, and at the Cairo University from 1955 to 1957. After archaelogical and ethnographic fieldwork in Upper Egypt and the Sudan, he taught as a professor at the Pontifical Urban University. 

Under the alias Brando he worked as an informant for the Italian domestic intelligence agency SISDE.

Works

Massime degli antichi egiziani (1954) as Maxims of the Ancient Egyptians (1987) translated by Guy Davenport
Liriche amorose degli antichi egiziani (1955)
Il libro dei morti degli antichi egiziani (1958)
Incantesimi e scongiuri degli antichi egiziani (1958)
The rock tomb of Irw-K3-Pth. (1960)
Incontro con l'arte Africana (1959) as Introduction to African Art (1966) translated by Peter Whigham
An Introduction to Egyptian Art (1960) translated by R. H. Boothroyd
Vita nell'antico Egitto (1962)
Black Eros: Sexual Customs of Africa from Prehistory to the Present Day (1964)
La Valle dei Re e delle Regine (1965)
Processo in verso (1973)
Sesso magico nell'Africa nera (1983)
Gli antichi Egizi. Immagini, scene e documenti di vita quotidiana (1987)
L'occhio del faraone. (1990) Rachewiltz, Boris de, Valenti Gomez i Oliver
7 Greeks (1995) with Guy Davenport
Roma Egizia. Culti, templi e devinità egizie nella Roma Imperiale (1999) with Anna Maria Partini
I miti egizi (2000)

References

Anne Conover (2001), Olga Rudge and Ezra Pound

See also

Italian Egyptologists
1926 births
1997 deaths
Pontifical Biblical Institute alumni